Minnesota State Highway 49 was a state highway in Minnesota. It originally followed Rice Street from downtown St. Paul into the northern suburbs of the Twin Cities, shifting a northern termini between Interstate 35W and also the Lino Lakes Correctional Facility.  In the late 1990s, the route was cut back to end at Interstate 694 in Shoreview and then fully removed shortly after.  Guide signs at the County Road 23 exit from Interstate 35W in Lino Lakes were marked as "OLD 49" for five years after the removal, however these signs were removed around 2003.

Route description
At its greatest length, Highway 49 ran from State Highway 3 (formerly Highway 218) in Inver Grove Heights, continuing north through downtown St. Paul, and ending at the Lino Lakes Correctional Facility.

Highway 49 served as a north–south route between the communities of Inver Grove Heights, Eagan, Mendota Heights, West St. Paul, St. Paul, Maplewood, Roseville, Little Canada, Vadnais Heights, North Oaks, Shoreview, and Lino Lakes.

The route had followed Dodd Road, Smith Avenue, West Seventh Street, St. Peter Street, Wabasha Street, Rice Street, Hodgson Road, Lake Drive, and Lilac Street.

History
Highway 49 was commissioned in 1933, running from State Highway 5 in downtown Saint Paul to then-U.S. Highway 8 in Lino Lakes.  In 1950, it was extended over what had been State Highway 88 (present day State Highway 149), across the High Bridge southbound to old State Highway 218 (later renumbered Highway 3) in Inver Grove Heights.  When a portion of Interstate 35W was constructed in 1966 and old U.S. 8 was moved to it at Lino Lakes, Highway 49 was then extended north along the former route of U.S. 8 and also replaced old State Highway 326, which served the Lino Lakes Correctional Facility.  In 1981, the route south of Highway 5 was renumbered 149 (Smith Avenue and Dodd Road).  The remainder of Highway 49 was decommissioned in 1997-1998, the Rice Street and Hodgson Road portions becoming County Road 49, the Lake Drive portion becoming County Road 23, and Lilac Street becoming County Road 153.

Major intersections
The following list includes the major intersections of Highway 49 from 1981 to 1998, when the route was decommissioned.

References

External links

049
Transportation in Saint Paul, Minnesota